The montane blind snake (Gerrhopilus inornatus) is a species of snake in the Gerrhopilidae family.

References

Gerrhopilus
Reptiles described in 1888